The discography of Australian hard rock band Wolfmother consists of six studio albums, four extended play (EPs), 18 singles, 14 music videos and one video album. The band have also contributed to two soundtracks and one tribute album. Originally from Sydney, Wolfmother were formed in 2004 by vocalist and guitarist Andrew Stockdale, bassist and keyboardist Chris Ross, and drummer Myles Heskett. After signing with Modular Recordings and releasing their self-titled debut EP in 2004, the band's debut full-length studio album, also titled Wolfmother, was released in Australia in October 2005. It reached number 3 on the Australian Albums Chart. The album was released internationally the following year, reaching number 25 in the UK, number 22 in the US, and selling over 1.6 million copies worldwide by 2009.

The band released their first live video Please Experience Wolfmother Live in August 2007, which reached number 7 on the Australian Music Video Chart. In August 2008, Ross and Heskett left the band due to "irreconcilable personal and musical differences". Stockdale and Wolfmother resurfaced early the next year with a new lineup including bassist and keyboardist Ian Peres, rhythm guitarist Aidan Nemeth and drummer Dave Atkins. The follow-up to Wolfmother, Cosmic Egg was released in October 2009, again reaching number 3 in Australia. It also reached the top 20 on the US Billboard 200, the Canadian Albums Chart, and other regional charts. The lead single from the album, "New Moon Rising", reached number 50 on the Australian Singles Chart and number 33 on the US Billboard Mainstream Rock chart.

After more lineup changes, Stockdale stopped using the Wolfmother name in 2013 and released a collection of recent recordings under his own name as Keep Moving. The band returned shortly after the album's release, however, and later released their third album New Crown in March 2014, which reached number 160 on the Billboard 200. The band issued their fourth studio album Victorious in February 2016, which reached number 17 on the Australian Albums Chart, number 25 on the UK Albums Chart, and number 71 on the US Billboard 200. Lead single "Victorious" peaked at number 26 on the Billboard Mainstream Rock chart. In 2017 the band released a music video for new song "Special Lady", and later the single "Freedom Is Mine", which were followed by "Happy Wolfmothers Day" in May 2018.

Studio albums

Extended plays

Singles

Videos

Video albums

Music videos

Other appearances

Footnotes

References

External links

Wolfmother official website

Discographies of Australian artists
Rock music group discographies
Discography